The 2010 Copa Colombia, officially the 2010 Copa Postobón for sponsorship reasons, was the eighth edition of the Copa Colombia, the national cup competition for clubs of DIMAYOR. It began on February 24 and ended on November 3. The winner, Deportivo Cali, earned a berth in the 2011 Copa Sudamericana.

Format
The format for 2010 differs from last year's. A total of 16 teams (instead of 12), which include the group winners, runners-up, and the four best third-placed teams, advance from the first phase to the second phase.

Phase I

Group A 
Group A comprises teams from the Caribbean Region.

Group B 
Group B comprises teams from the Paisa Region.

Group C 
Group C comprises teams from Santander, Norte de Santander, and Boyacá.

Group D 
Group D comprises teams from Bogotá and Villavicencio.

Group E 
Group E comprises teams from the Pacific Region.

Group F 
Group F comprises teams from Cundinamarca and the western part of the country.

Phase II
In all tables, Team #2 played the second leg at home.

Round of 16
First legs: August 18 and 19; Second legs: August 25.

|}

Quarterfinals
First legs: September 8, 15 and 16; Second legs: September 22, 23 and 29.

|}

Semifinals
First legs: October 6; Second legs: October 13.

|}

Final

Deportivo Cali won on points 6–0

Top goalscorers

See also
Copa Colombia
DIMAYOR

References

External links 
Official website of DIMAYOR 
2010 Copa Colombia on RSSSF
2010 Copa Colombia on Soccerway.com

2010
Copa
Colombia